Jonna Mendes (born March 31, 1979) is a former World Cup alpine ski racer from the United States. She specialized in the speed events and raced for nine seasons on the World Cup circuit. Mendes competed in two Winter Olympics and four World Championships. She was the bronze medalist in the Super G at the 2003 World Championships in St. Moritz, Switzerland.

Born in Santa Cruz on the California coast, Mendes began skiing at age four when her family moved to the Lake Tahoe area in the Sierra Nevada mountains. She made her World Cup debut in March 1997 and retired from international competition in May 2006.

Mendes won three U.S. titles: two in giant slalom (2001, 2002) and one in downhill (2004). The first came at The Big Mountain in Whitefish, Montana, but was followed by a broken foot the next day, incurred in a crash near the end of her second run in the slalom. She repeated the next year at her home venue of Squaw Valley, and won the last at Alyeska in Alaska.

After racing
In 2011, Mendes became the recruiting coordinator for the new Sun Valley Ski Academy in Sun Valley, Idaho. She attended college in New York City and had been working with the U.S. Ski Team's national alpine development system for the previous four years.

World Cup results

Top ten finishes 
 5 Downhill, 5 Super G

Season standings

World Championship results

Olympic results

References

External links
 
 Jonna Mendes World Cup standings at the International Ski Federation
 
 
 Sun Valley Ski Academy – Jonna's blog

1979 births
Living people
American female alpine skiers
Olympic alpine skiers of the United States
Alpine skiers at the 1998 Winter Olympics
Alpine skiers at the 2002 Winter Olympics
21st-century American women